Egypt is a country mainly in North Africa.

Egypt may also refer to:

Places

Egypt 
the country of the lower Nile Valley
historically:
Ancient Egypt (prehistory – 30 BC)
Egypt (Roman province) (30 BC – AD 639)
Arab Egypt (639–1250)
Mamluk Sultanate (Cairo) (1250–1517)
Ottoman Egypt (1517–1914), divided into two main periods:
Egypt Eyalet (1517–1867), a state under direct rule of the Ottoman Empire
Khedivate of Egypt (1867–1914), an autonomous tributary state of the Ottoman Empire
Sultanate of Egypt (1914-1922) under British colonial influence
Kingdom of Egypt (1922–1953)
Republic of Egypt (1953–58)

Australia 
Egypt, Queensland, a rural locality in Lockyer Valley Region

United Kingdom 
 Egypt, Berkshire, a location in England
 Egypt, Buckinghamshire, a hamlet in England
 Egypt, Hampshire, a location in England
 Egypt, West Yorkshire, England
 Egypt, an area of Tollcross, Glasgow, Scotland

United States 
 Egypt, Arkansas
Egypt, Georgia
Egypt, Indiana
Egypt, Mississippi (disambiguation)
Egypt, Ohio
Egypt, Belmont County, Ohio
Egypt, Pennsylvania
Egypt, Texas (disambiguation), any of several place names
Egypt, West Virginia
Little Egypt (region), a regional name indicating southern Illinois
New Egypt, New Jersey

Titles
Egypt (1991 video game), a game for the Famicom
Egypt 1156 B.C., a 1997 adventure video game
Egypt II: The Heliopolis Prophecy, a 2000 sequel
Egypt III, a 2004 sequel
Egypt (TV series), a 2005 BBC TV docudrama on the history of Egyptology
Egypt (album), a 2004 album by Youssou N'Dour
"Egypt", a poem by Patti Smith included in her 1978 book Babel
Egypt (Bethel Music and Cory Asbury song), a 2020 by Bethel Music and Cory Asbury
"Egypt", a song by Mercyful Fate from their 1993 album In the Shadows
"Egypt", a song by Symphony X from their 2000 album V: The New Mythology Suite
Egypt (comics), an American comic book miniseries started in 1995

Other
Egypt Sherrod (born 1976), American radio personality
Egypt (bird), a Scottish English term for the Spotted Flycatcher
Mizraim, the Hebrew and Aramaic Name for Egypt, son of Ham in the Bible
Egypt (electoral coalition), an electoral coalition formed for the 2015 Egyptian parliamentary election
SS Egypt, a P&O liner which sunk in the English Channel in 1922

See also
Egyptian (disambiguation)
Little Egypt (disambiguation)